Fernando Louro (born 1 June 1922) was a Cuban weightlifter. He competed in the men's lightweight event at the 1948 Summer Olympics.

References

External links
 

1922 births
Possibly living people
Cuban male weightlifters
Olympic weightlifters of Cuba
Weightlifters at the 1948 Summer Olympics
Place of birth missing
20th-century Cuban people